The men's marathon at the 1968 Summer Olympics in Mexico City, Mexico, was held on Sunday October 20, 1968. The race started at 15:00h local time. There were 75 competitors from 41 countries. Eighteen of them did not finish. The maximum number of athletes per nation had been set at 3 since the 1930 Olympic Congress. The event was won by Mamo Wolde of Ethiopia, the nation's third consecutive gold medal in the Olympic marathon (matching France for most golds overall in the event).

Background

This was the 16th appearance of the event, which is one of 12 athletics events to have been held at every Summer Olympics. Returning runners from the 1964 marathon included two-time defending champion Abebe Bikila of Ethiopia, fifth-place finisher József Sütő of Hungary, and eighth-place finisher Kenji Kimihara of Japan. Bikila would have been favored but was recovering from an appendectomy and stress fracture. His countryman Mamo Wolde (who had run in 1964 but had not finished, while his brother Demissie Wolde finished 10th) was a "formidable contender," particularly with the high altitude of Mexico City seen as being favorable to the Ethiopian team, used to high altitudes.

Costa Rica, Guyana, Kuwait, Nigeria, the Philippines, Sierra Leone, Uganda, Uruguay, and Zambia each made their first appearance in Olympic marathons; East and West Germany competed separately for the first time. The United States made its 16th appearance, the only nation to have competed in each Olympic marathon to that point.

Competition format and course

As all Olympic marathons, the competition was a single race. The marathon distance of 26 miles, 385 yards was run over a point-to-point course. The course ran from the Zócalo to the Olympic Stadium.

Records

These were the standing world and Olympic records prior to the 1968 Summer Olympics.

No new world or Olympic bests were set during the competition.

Schedule

All times are Central Standard Time (UTC-6)

Results

References

External links
  Marathon Info

M
Marathons at the Olympics
Men's marathons
Oly
1968 Summer Olympics
Men's events at the 1968 Summer Olympics